Hunderfossen is a village in Lillehammer Municipality in Innlandet county, Norway. The small village features the Hunderfossen Familiepark, the Lillehammer Olympic Bobsleigh and Luge Track, and the Hunderfossen Station on the Dovrebanen railway line.

The village is named after the nearby Hunderfoss waterfall on the river.

References

Lillehammer
Villages in Innlandet
Populated places on the Gudbrandsdalslågen